"Like We Never Had a Broken Heart" is a song written by Pat Alger and Garth Brooks, and recorded by American country music artist Trisha Yearwood. It was released in September 1991 as the second single from her debut album Trisha Yearwood.  The song reached number 4 on the Billboard Hot Country Singles & Tracks chart. In Canada, Garth Brooks received a secondary credit on the song.

Music video
The music video was directed by Marc Ball and premiered in October 1991.

Chart performance

Year-end charts

References

1991 singles
Trisha Yearwood songs
Songs written by Pat Alger
Songs written by Garth Brooks
Song recordings produced by Garth Fundis
MCA Records singles
1991 songs
Songs about heartache